Nullisomic is a genetic condition involving the lack of both the normal chromosomal pairs for a species (2n-2).  Humans with this condition will not survive.

Causes

Nullisomy is caused by non-disjunction, during meiosis that causes two of the gametes to have no chromosomal material, leaving the other two gametes to have double the amount of chromosomal material (disomic). Due to the lack of genetic information, the nullisomic gametes are rendered unviable for fertilization.

See also
 Monosomic
 Trisomic

References

Genetic disorders with no OMIM